"Irish Son" is a song written by Guy Chambers and Brian McFadden, and produced by Chambers and Paul Stacey, for McFadden's first solo album, Irish Son (2004). It was released as the album's second single in the United Kingdom on 22 November 2004.

The song was released following a large media build-up due to the success of his first single. However, the launch of the song was marred by controversy when many radio stations and music channels banned the song and its accompanying music video due to the song's lyrical content and the bad reflection focused on CBS schools in Ireland. Elton John slammed the song's lyrical content when he reviewed the track in Time Out, claiming the song was "just horrible". With the bad press surrounding the song, it peaked at number six.

Track listings
UK CD1
 "Irish Son" – 4:20 
 "Be True to Your Woman" – 3:46 

UK CD2
 "Irish Son" – 4:20 
 "Optimystik" – 4:13 
 "Three Babies and a Man" – 3:42 
 "Irish Son" (video) – 4:20

Charts

Weekly charts

Year-end charts

Release history

References

2004 singles
2004 songs
Brian McFadden songs
Criticism of the Catholic Church
Song recordings produced by Guy Chambers
Songs written by Brian McFadden
Songs written by Guy Chambers
Sony Music UK singles